Moose (December 24, 1990 – June 22, 2006) was a wire-hair Jack Russell Terrier who portrayed Eddie Crane on the American television sitcom Frasier.

Early life
Moose was born on Christmas Eve, 1990, in Florida, the youngest littermate. He was the largest puppy in the litter. Like Pal, the original Lassie, the rambunctious puppy was too much for his original owner. According to an article by Lori Golden:

Career
Moose won the role on Frasier after only six months of training.  Moose had the ability to fix Kelsey Grammer with a long hard stare; this became a running sight gag on the show.  When Moose had to lick his co-stars, however, sardine oil was applied upon the actors' faces. John Mahoney once revealed liver pâté was dabbed behind the actor's ears to make Moose nuzzle the actors.

Moose had numerous television appearances and several magazine covers to his credit. There is an official Moose calendar and an "autobiography", My Life as a Dog, which was written by Brian Hargrove, husband of actor David Hyde Pierce who portrays Niles Crane in Frasier.

Retirement
Moose spent the last six and a half years of his life in retirement in West Los Angeles with son Enzo, their trainer Mathilde de Cagny, her husband Michael Halberg, and Jill, the dog from As Good as It Gets. In his last year of life, he suffered from dementia and deafness. He died of natural causes at home at the age of 15 on June 22, 2006.

Selected credits
Universal Studios Animal Actors’ Showcase
Coach print advertisements (National campaign)
Rold Gold Pretzel TV commercials
Frasier – "Eddie" (1993–2000)
My Dog Skip – Skip (2000)

See also
 List of individual dogs

References

External links
 
 Frasier's Best Friend 'Eddie' Dies
 "My Life As A Dog", Eddie's Autobiography by Brian Hargrove at Amazon.com

1990 animal births
2006 animal deaths
Dog actors